The 1891 Aston Manor by-election was a parliamentary by-election held for the United Kingdom House of Commons constituency of Aston Manor on 20 March 1891. It was triggered by the death of incumbent MP George Kynoch.

Results

References 

1891 in England
1891 elections in the United Kingdom
March 1891 events
By-elections to the Parliament of the United Kingdom in Warwickshire constituencies
19th century in Warwickshire